The Petite Pointe d'Orny is a mountain of the Mont Blanc Massif, overlooking the Trient Glacier in the canton of Valais. It lies north of the Pointe d'Orny.

References

External links
 Petite Pointe d'Orny on Hikr

Mountains of the Alps
Alpine three-thousanders
Mountains of Valais
Mountains of Switzerland